Damlapınar can refer to:

 Damlapınar, Karataş
 Damlapınar, Palu